Thin Air may refer to:

 Thin Air (album), a 2009 album by Peter Hammill
 Thin Air Community Radio (KYRS), a low-powered radio station in Spokane, Washington
 Thin Air (Morgan novel), a 2018 science fiction novel by Richard K. Morgan
 Thin Air (Parker novel), a 1995 Spenser novel by Robert B. Parker
 Thin Air, a 2000 Spenser TV film based on the novel
 Thin Air (Star Trek), a 2000 Star Trek: New Earth novel by Dean Wesley Smith and Kristine Kathryn Rusch
 Winnipeg International Writers Festival or THIN AIR, an annual literary festival
 Thin Air, a story arc in the comics series The Pulse
 "Thin Air", a song by Keane, a B-side of the single "Nothing in My Way"
 "Thin Air", a song by Pearl Jam from the album Binaural
 "Thin Air", a song by Olivia Holt from the EP Olivia
 Thin Air, a composition made by Calliope Tsoupaki

See also 
 Into Thin Air (disambiguation)
 Out of Thin Air (disambiguation)
 Thin airfoil theory, a theory on airfoils